Culter railway station was opened on 8 September 1853 by the Deeside Railway and served the town of Peterculter that is locally known as Culter. The Deeside Railway was taken over by the GNoSR and in 1894 Culter was the terminus for the Aberdeen suburban service although a few trains continued to Banchory. Despite the 1937 closure of many other stations on the Aberdeen suburban service, Culter remained open until 1966 as an intermediate station on the Deeside Railway that ran from Aberdeen (Joint) to Ballater. Culter is located in the parish of Peterculter, Aberdeenshire, Scotland.

History 

The first single platformed station was opened in 1853 and stood to the west of the replacement provided at the track doubling of 1892. The goods yard lay to the east and was approached from that end and remained after the new station that was opened close to the ruins of St Peter's Chapel. A short line ran to the Culter Paper Mill and the town developed around this site. The line west towards Park from the new station site was not doubled until 1899.

The Deeside branch at first was operated by the Deeside Railway. The line became part of the GNoSR and at grouping merged with the London and North Eastern Railway. It stood 7.5 miles (12 km) from Aberdeen Joint and 43.25 miles (69.5 km) from Ballater. It was closed to passengers on 28 February 1966. The line has been lifted and sections form part of the Deeside Way long-distance footpath.

Infrastructure

The 1853 station only had a short single platform on the later eastbound or northern side. By 1892 the line had been doubled and a goods yard built on the eastern side with two sidings, approached from the east. A complex and extensive network of lines lay within the paper works buildings. The goods yard had several sidings, a crane and weighing machine. The line west towards Park from the new station site was not completely doubled until after 1899.

A pedestrian footbridge was present, a signal box on the western end of the eastbound platform, typical GNoSR wooden station buildings and a shelter on the westbound platform together with a water tank tower. Crossover points lay towards the east end of the platforms and a single siding lay parallel to the line on the southern side.

By 1963 the main line had been singled with the westbound track lifted, the pedestrian bridge removed, but the signalbox retained. Only the eastbound platform was in use by this time. The goods yard was still present as was the double track section through the station and the paper works lines. The freight line that led to Culter Paper Mills remained in use until 2 January 1967.

Services
Suburban services, "subbies", began between Aberdeen and Culter in 1894, calling at all eight intermediate stations in a seven-mile stretch of line in around 20 minutes with a total of around 30 trains every day. Culter was served in 1914 by thirty-five trains eastbound and thirty-six westbound, all within a seventeen-hour working day. The "subbies" service was withdrawn from 5 April 1937 due to competition from bus services. The Aberdeen suburban railway stations were Holburn Street, Ruthrieston, Pitfodels, Cults, West Cults, Murtle, Milltimber and Culter.

The line was chosen to trial the battery multiple unit and once introduced on 21 April 1958 the train service was doubled to six trains a day and in addition a Sunday service was reinstated.

The site today 
The station buildings have been demolished but one platform remains in good condition and the bridge abutments with the trackbed in use as part of the Deeside Way.</ref> The Royal Deeside Railway is located at Milton of Crathes some distance down the line towards Ballater.

References

Sources
 
 Maxtone, Graham and Cooper, Mike (2018). Then and Now on the Great North. V.1. GNoSR Association. .

External links
Film of the station and the Deeside line.
Dismantling the Deeside Line.

Disused railway stations in Aberdeenshire
Beeching closures in Scotland
Former Great North of Scotland Railway stations
Railway stations in Great Britain opened in 1853
Railway stations in Great Britain closed in 1966
1966 disestablishments in Scotland